March 8 - Eastern Orthodox liturgical calendar - March 10

All fixed commemorations below are observed on March 22 by Orthodox Churches on the Old Calendar.

For March 9th, Orthodox Churches on the Old Calendar commemorate the Saints listed on February 24 (February 25 on leap years).

Saints

 Martyr Urpasian the Senator, at Nicomedia, by being burned alive (c. 305)
 The Holy Forty Martyrs of Sebaste (320):
 Cyrion (or Quirio), Candidus, Domnus, Hesychius, Heraclius, Smaragdus, Eunoicus, Valens, Vivianus, Claudius, Priscus, Theodulus, Eutychius, John, Xanthias, Helianus, Sisinius, Angus, Aetius, Flavius, Acacius, Ecdicius, Lysimachus, Alexander, Elias, Gorgonius, Theophilus, Dometian, Gaius, Leontius, Athanasius, Cyril, Sacerdon, Nicholas, Valerius, Philoctimon, Severian, Chudion, Aglaius, and Meliton.
 Saint Caesarius of Nazianzus (Caesarios the Doctor), brother of St. Gregory the Theologian (369)
 Saint Philoromus the Confessor, of Galatia (4th century)
 Righteous Tarasius the Wonderworker, of Lycaonia. (see also March 8 and May 7)

Pre-Schism Western saints

 Saint Pacianus, Bishop of Barcelona (390)
 Saint Constantine of Cornwall and Govan (576) (see also: March 11)
 Saint Bosa of York, Bishop of York (705)
 Venerable Vitalis of Castronovo, Sicily (994)
 Saint Anthony, a monk at Luxeuil in France, became a hermit in Froidemont in Franche-Comté (10th century)

Post-Schism Orthodox saints

 Saint Jonah, archbishop of Novgorod (1470)
 New Martyrs (two priests and forty students) of Momišići, Montenegro (1688)
 Saint Theodosius Levitsky, priest of Balta, Odessa (1845)
 Saint Dimitra (Ihorova), nun and foundress of the Vvedensk (Vovedenska) Convent in Kiev (1878)

New martyrs and confessors

 New Hieromartyr Mitrophan Buchnoff, Archpriest, of Voronezh (1931)
 New Hieromartyr Joasaph (Shakhov), Abbot, of Popovka (Moscow) (1938)
 New Hieromartyrs (1938):
 Michael Maslov, Alexis Smirnov, Demetrius Glivenko, Sergius Lebedev, Sergius Zvetkov, Priests;
 Nicholas Goryunov, Protodeacon.
 Virgin-martyrs Natalia Yulianova and Alexandra Samoylovoy (1938)

Other commemorations

 Translation to Vladimir (1230) of the relics of Martyr Abraham of the Bulgars on the Volga (1229)
 "Albazin" Icon of the Most Holy Theotokos ("The Word Was Made Flesh") (1666){{#tag:ref|The Albazin Icon of the Mother of God “the Word made Flesh” is of great religious significance in the Amur River region. It received its name from the Russian fortress of Albazin (now the village of Albazino) along the Amur river, founded in the year 1650 by the famous Russian frontier ataman Hierotheus Khabarov on the site of a settlement of the Daurian prince Albaza. For more than 300 years the Wonderworking Albazin Icon of the Mother of God watched over the Amur frontier of Russia.<ref>Icon of the Mother of God “The Word was made Flesh”. OCA - Lives of the Saints.</ref>|group=note}}
 Repose of Elder Cleopas of Ostrov-Vvedensky Monastery (1778)Great Synaxaristes:  Ὁ Ὅσιος Κλεόπας ἐκ Ρωσίας. 9 Μαρτίου. ΜΕΓΑΣ ΣΥΝΑΞΑΡΙΣΤΗΣ.
 Repose of Schema-Archimandrite Theophilus (Rossokha) of Kiev (1996) Схиархимандрит Феофил (Россоха) (1929–1996). Православная энциклопедия «Азбука веры» (Azbyka.ru). Retrieved: 8 November 2019.

Icon gallery

Notes

References

Sources
 March 9/March 22. Orthodox Calendar (PRAVOSLAVIE.RU).
 March 22 / March 9. HOLY TRINITY RUSSIAN ORTHODOX CHURCH (A parish of the Patriarchate of Moscow).
 March 9. OCA - The Lives of the Saints.
 The Autonomous Orthodox Metropolia of Western Europe and the Americas (ROCOR). St. Hilarion Calendar of Saints for the year of our Lord 2004. St. Hilarion Press (Austin, TX). p. 20.
 March 9. Latin Saints of the Orthodox Patriarchate of Rome.
 The Roman Martyrology. Transl. by the Archbishop of Baltimore. Last Edition, According to the Copy Printed at Rome in 1914. Revised Edition, with the Imprimatur of His Eminence Cardinal Gibbons. Baltimore: John Murphy Company, 1916. pp. 70–71.
Greek Sources
 Great Synaxaristes:  9 ΜΑΡΤΙΟΥ. ΜΕΓΑΣ ΣΥΝΑΞΑΡΙΣΤΗΣ.
  Συναξαριστής. 9 Μαρτίου.'' ECCLESIA.GR. (H ΕΚΚΛΗΣΙΑ ΤΗΣ ΕΛΛΑΔΟΣ).
Russian Sources
  22 марта (9 марта). Православная Энциклопедия под редакцией Патриарха Московского и всея Руси Кирилла (электронная версия). (Orthodox Encyclopedia - Pravenc.ru).
  9 марта (ст.ст.) 22 марта 2013 (нов. ст.). Русская Православная Церковь Отдел внешних церковных связей. (DECR).

March in the Eastern Orthodox calendar